"Come Get Some" is a song by American recording group TLC. It was written by band members Tionne "T-Boz" Watkins and Rozonda "Chilli" Thomas along with Kandi Burruss, Craig Love, Sean P of YoungBloodZ and Lil' Jon for their greatest hits album, Now and Forever: The Hits (2003). Lil Jon produced the song and also appears with Sean P as guest vocalists.

The song was released as a standalone single in 2003, a year after the death of group member Lisa Lopes.  While a music video was never produced, the song was performed a few times. Lil Jon performed the song's intro on the season finale of American Idol with TLC in May 2011 and again 10 years later at the 2021 iHeartRadio Music Awards without TLC during a medley with Usher. A commercial success, it peaked at number 15 on Billboards Hot R&B/Hip-Hop Songs chart.

Track listing
All tracks written by Jonathan Smith, Tionne "T-Boz" Watkins, Rozonda "Chilli" Thomas, Kandi Burruss, Craig Love, and Sean Paul Joseph; produced by Lil' Jon.

Credits and personnel 
Credits adapted from the liner notes of Now & Forever: The Hits.

Kandi Burruss – writer
John Frye – engineer
Mark Goodchild – recording engineer
Sean Paul Joseph – vocals, writer
Craig Love – guitar, writer

Rozonda "Chilli" Thomas – vocals, writer
Sam Thomas – recording engineer
Jonathan "Lil' Jon" Smith – mixing engineer, producer, writer
Tionne "T-Boz" Watkins – vocals, writer

Charts

References

External links
Review on Rhapsody 

2003 singles
Lil Jon songs
TLC (group) songs
Songs written by Lil Jon
Songs written by Kandi Burruss
Song recordings produced by Lil Jon
2003 songs
Songs written by Tionne Watkins
Arista Records singles
Songs written by Rozonda Thomas
Songs written by Craig Love
Crunk songs